Cane Creek is a  long 3rd order tributary to the Hyco River in Person County, North Carolina.  Cane Creek joins the Hyco River within Hyco Lake.

Variant names
According to the Geographic Names Information System, it has also been known historically as:
Cain Creek

Course
Cane Creek rises in a pond about 0.25 miles southeast of Semora, North Carolina in Caswell County, and then flows northeast into Person County to join the Hyco River about 1.5 miles west of McGehee Mills.

Watershed
Cane Creek drains  of area, receives about 46.0 in/year of precipitation, has a wetness index of 411.27, and is about 54% forested.

References

Rivers of North Carolina
Rivers of Caswell County, North Carolina
Rivers of Person County, North Carolina
Tributaries of the Roanoke River